Atago may refer to:

 Atago Gongen, a Japanese kami

Places in Japan
 Atago, Tokyo, a district of Minato, Tokyo
 Atago Shrine (Tokyo), in Minato, Tokyo
 Atago Green Hills, an urban complex located in Atago
 Mount Atago, a mountain in Kyoto, Japan
 Atago Shrine (Kyoto), a shrine on Mount Atago
 Mount Atago (Minamibōsō, Chiba), a mountain in Chiba Prefecture
 Atago Station (Chiba), a train station in Noda, Chiba Prefecture
 Atago Station (Miyagi), a train station in Matsushima, Miyagi Prefecture

Ships 
 , of the early Imperial Japanese Navy
 , of the Imperial Japanese Navy
 , a projected Amagi-class battlecruiser of the Imperial Japanese Navy that was canceled under the terms of Washington Naval Treaty
 ,  of the Japan Maritime Self-Defense Force
 , an Atago-class guided missile destroyer in the Japan Maritime Self-Defense Force
 Atago Maru, a merchant ship built in Glasgow in 1924 by Lithgows & Sons